The meridian 136° east of Greenwich is a line of longitude that extends from the North Pole across the Arctic Ocean, Asia, the Pacific Ocean, Australasia, the Indian Ocean, the Southern Ocean, and Antarctica to the South Pole.

The 136th meridian east forms a great circle with the 44th meridian west.

From Pole to Pole
Starting at the North Pole and heading south to the South Pole, the 136th meridian east passes through:

{| class="wikitable plainrowheaders"
! scope="col" width="130" | Co-ordinates
! scope="col" | Country, territory or sea
! scope="col" | Notes
|-
| style="background:#b0e0e6;" | 
! scope="row" style="background:#b0e0e6;" | Arctic Ocean
| style="background:#b0e0e6;" |
|-
| style="background:#b0e0e6;" | 
! scope="row" style="background:#b0e0e6;" | Laptev Sea
| style="background:#b0e0e6;" |
|-
| 
! scope="row" | 
| Sakha Republic — Belkovsky Island, New Siberian Islands
|-
| style="background:#b0e0e6;" | 
! scope="row" style="background:#b0e0e6;" | Laptev Sea
| style="background:#b0e0e6;" |
|-
| 
! scope="row" | 
| Sakha Republic — Stolbovoy Island, New Siberian Islands
|-
| style="background:#b0e0e6;" | 
! scope="row" style="background:#b0e0e6;" | Laptev Sea
| style="background:#b0e0e6;" |
|-valign="top"
| 
! scope="row" | 
| Sakha Republic Khabarovsk Krai — from 
|-
| style="background:#b0e0e6;" | 
! scope="row" style="background:#b0e0e6;" | Sea of Okhotsk
| style="background:#b0e0e6;" |
|-valign="top"
| 
! scope="row" | 
| Khabarovsk Krai Primorsky Krai — from 
|-
| style="background:#b0e0e6;" | 
! scope="row" style="background:#b0e0e6;" | Sea of Japan
| style="background:#b0e0e6;" |
|-valign="top"
| 
! scope="row" | 
|-
| style="background:#b0e0e6;" | 
! scope="row" style="background:#b0e0e6;" | Pacific Ocean
| style="background:#b0e0e6;" |
|-
| 
! scope="row" | 
| Island of Biak
|-
| style="background:#b0e0e6;" | 
! scope="row" style="background:#b0e0e6;" | Pacific Ocean
| style="background:#b0e0e6;" |
|-
| 
! scope="row" | 
| Island of Yapen
|-
| style="background:#b0e0e6;" | 
! scope="row" style="background:#b0e0e6;" | Cenderawasih Bay
| style="background:#b0e0e6;" |
|-
| 
! scope="row" | 
| Island of New Guinea
|-
| style="background:#b0e0e6;" | 
! scope="row" style="background:#b0e0e6;" | Arafura Sea
| style="background:#b0e0e6;" |
|-
| 
! scope="row" | 
| Northern Territory — Drysdale Island and mainland
|-
| style="background:#b0e0e6;" | 
! scope="row" style="background:#b0e0e6;" | Gulf of Carpentaria
| style="background:#b0e0e6;" |
|-valign="top"
| 
! scope="row" | 
| Northern Territory South Australia — from 
|-
| style="background:#b0e0e6;" | 
! scope="row" style="background:#b0e0e6;" | Indian Ocean
| style="background:#b0e0e6;" | Australian authorities consider this to be part of the Southern Ocean
|-
| style="background:#b0e0e6;" | 
! scope="row" style="background:#b0e0e6;" | Southern Ocean
| style="background:#b0e0e6;" |
|-
| 
! scope="row" | Antarctica
| Australian Antarctic Territory, claimed by 
|-
|}

See also
135th meridian east
137th meridian east

References

e136 meridian east